James Bayou Township is an inactive township in Mississippi County, in the U.S. state of Missouri.

A variant name was "St. James Bayou Township". James Bayou Township was established in 1836, taking its name from the St. James Bayou within its borders.

References

Townships in Missouri
Townships in Mississippi County, Missouri